The 1897 Dickinson football team was an American football team that represented Dickinson College as an independent during the 1897 college football season. The team compiled a 7–3–2 record and outscored opponents by a total of 146 to 69. Nathan Stauffer was the team's head coach.

Schedule

References

Dickinson
Dickinson Red Devils football seasons
Dickinson football